Édouard Marie Herriot (5 July 1872 – 26 March 1957) was a French Radical politician of the Third Republic who served three times as Prime Minister (1924–1925; 1926; 1932) and twice as President of the Chamber of Deputies. He led the first Cartel des Gauches. Under the Fourth Republic, he served as President of the National Assembly until 1954. An historian by occupation, Herriot was elected to the Académie Française's eighth seat in 1946.

Life
Hérriot was born at Troyes, France on 5 July 1872.  He served as Mayor of Lyon from 1905 until his death, except for a brief period from 1940 to 1945, when he was exiled to Germany for opposing the Vichy regime. As mayor, Herriot improved relations between municipal government and local unions, increased public assistance funds, and began an urban renewal programme, amongst other measures. He died in Lyon on 26 March 1957. He allegedly went through a Deathbed conversion to Catholicism with Cardinal Pierre-Marie Gerlier, and was buried at the Loyasse Cemetery "with church ritual".

Herriot's First Ministry, 14 June 1924 – 17 April 1925
Édouard Herriot - President of the Council and Minister of Foreign Affairs
Charles Nollet - Minister of War
Camille Chautemps - Minister of the Interior
Étienne Clémentel - Minister of Finance
Justin Godart - Minister of Labour, Hygiene, Welfare Work, and Social Security Provisions
René Renoult - Minister of Justice
Jacques-Louis Dumesnil - Minister of Marine
François Albert - Minister of Public Instruction and Fine Arts
Édouard Amédée Bovier-Lapierre - Minister of Pensions
Henri Queuille - Minister of Agriculture
Édouard Daladier - Minister of Colonies
Victor Peytral - Minister of Public Works
Eugène Raynaldy - Minister of Commerce and Industry
Victor Dalbiez - Minister of Liberated Regions

Changes
3 April 1925 - Anatole de Monzie succeeds Clémentel as Minister of Finance.

Herriot's Second Ministry, 19–23 July 1926
Édouard Herriot - President of the Council and Minister of Foreign Affairs
Paul Painlevé - Minister of War
Camille Chautemps - Minister of the Interior
Anatole de Monzie - Minister of Finance
Louis Pasquet - Minister of Labour, Hygiene, Welfare Work, and Social Security Provisions
Maurice Colrat - Minister of Justice
René Renoult - Minister of Marine
Édouard Daladier - Minister of Public Instruction and Fine Arts
Georges Bonnet - Minister of Pensions
Henri Queuille - Minister of Agriculture
Adrien Dariac - Minister of Colonies
Orly André-Hesse - Minister of Public Works
Louis Loucheur - Minister of Commerce and Industry

Herriot's Third Ministry, 3 June – 18 December 1932
Édouard Herriot - President of the Council and Minister of Foreign Affairs
Joseph Paul-Boncour - Minister of War
Camille Chautemps - Minister of the Interior
Louis Germain-Martin - Minister of Finance
Maurice Palmade - Minister of Budget
Albert Dalimier - Minister of Labour and Social Security Provisions
René Renoult - Minister of Justice
Georges Leygues - Minister of Marine
Léon Meyer - Minister of Merchant Marine
Paul Painlevé - Minister of Air
Anatole de Monzie - Minister of National Education
Aimé Berthod - Minister of Pensions
Abel Gardey - Minister of Agriculture
Albert Sarraut - Minister of Colonies
Édouard Daladier - Minister of Public Works
Justin Godart - Minister of Public Health
Henri Queuille - Minister of Posts, Telegraphs, and Telephones
Julien Durand - Minister of Commerce and Industry

Denial of the Holodomor

The height of denial of the Holodomor was reached during a visit to Ukraine carried out between 26 August and 9 September 1933 by Herriot, who had recently left the French Prime Ministry. Herriot denied accounts of the famine and said that Soviet Ukraine was "like a garden in full bloom".

Furthermore, he announced to the press that there was no famine in Ukraine, that he did not see any trace of hunger, and that the allegations of starving millions were being spread by adversaries of the Soviet Union.  "When one believes that the Ukraine is devastated by famine, allow me to shrug my shoulders", he declared.  The 13 September 1933 issue of Pravda was able to write that Herriot "categorically contradicted the lies of the bourgeoisie press in connection with a famine in the USSR."

Political career

Governmental functions

Président of the Council of Ministers : 1924–1925 / 19–21 July 1926 / June–December 1932.

Minister of Transport, Public Works and Supply : 1916–1917.

Minister of Education and Fine Arts : 1926–1928.

Minister of Foreign Affairs : 1924–1925 / 19–21 July 1926 / June–December 1932.

Minister of State : 1934–1936.

Electoral mandates

National Assembly of France

President of the National Assembly of France : 1947–1954.

Member of the National Assembly of France for Rhône (department) : 1946–1957 (He died in 1957). Elected in 1946, reelected in 1951, 1956.

Constitutional Assembly

Member of the Constitutional Assembly for Rhône (department) : 1945–1946. Elected in 1945, reelected in June 1946.

Chamber of Deputies of France

President of the Chamber of Deputies of France : 1925–1926 / 1936–1940.

Member of the Chamber of Deputies of France for Rhône (department) : 1919–1942 (Dissolution of Parliament by Philippe Petain in 1942). Elected in 1919, reelected in 1924, 1928, 1932, 1936.

Senate of France

Senator of Rhône : 1912–1919. Elected in 1911.

General council

General councillor of Rhône (department) : 1945–1951.

Municipal Council

Mayor of Lyon : 1905–1940 (Deposition by Vichy regime in 1940) / 1945–1957 (He died in 1957). Reelected in 1908, 1912, 1919, 1925, 1929, 1935, 1945, 1947, 1953.

Municipal councillor of Lyon : 1904–1940 (Deposition by the Vichy regime in 1940) / 1945–1957 (He died in 1957). Reelected in 1908, 1912, 1919, 1925, 1929, 1935, 1945, 1947, 1953.

Political functions

President of the Radical Party (France) : 1919–1926 / 1931–1936 / 1948–1953 / 1955–1957.

Legacy
Herriot was declared an honorary citizen of the city of Veliki Bečkerek (today Zrenjanin) in 1933. There is also a street with his name in Zrenjanin.

His visit to a church in Kyiv, where a fake religious service was organized for the occasion, is described in "The Mechanical Lions", one of the stories in A Tomb for Boris Davidovich by Danilo Kiš.

See also
Foire de Lyon
 Interwar France

Notes

References

Further reading
 De Tarr, Francis. The French Radical Party: From Herriot to Mendès-France (Greenwood, 1980).

External links

 

1872 births
1957 deaths
People from Troyes
Politicians from Auvergne-Rhône-Alpes
Radical Party (France) politicians
Prime Ministers of France
Transport ministers of France
Government ministers of France
French Senators of the Third Republic
Senators of Rhône (department)
Presidents of the Chamber of Deputies (France)
Members of the 12th Chamber of Deputies of the French Third Republic
Members of the 13th Chamber of Deputies of the French Third Republic
Members of the 14th Chamber of Deputies of the French Third Republic
Members of the 15th Chamber of Deputies of the French Third Republic
Members of the 16th Chamber of Deputies of the French Third Republic
Members of the Constituent Assembly of France (1945)
Members of the Constituent Assembly of France (1946)
Presidents of the National Assembly (France)
Deputies of the 1st National Assembly of the French Fourth Republic
Deputies of the 2nd National Assembly of the French Fourth Republic
Deputies of the 3rd National Assembly of the French Fourth Republic
Mayors of Lyon
Lycée Louis-le-Grand alumni
École Normale Supérieure alumni
Members of the Académie Française
Recipients of the Order of the White Eagle (Poland)
Holodomor deniers